The Mid Wales South League is an association football league, currently consisting of five clubs, mainly from Mid Wales but some from just over the border in England.  It is currently called the Watson Financial Mid Wales League (South) for sponsorship reasons.

The founder members of the league were Brecon St John's, Felindre, Llandrindod Wells, Llanwrthwl, Llanwrtyd, Presteigne St. Andrew's, Rhayader Town and Whitton.  Felindre were the first league champions.

The league lies in the fifth level of the Welsh football league system. Teams may be promoted to the Mid Wales Football League if standards and facilities fall into line with the regulations of the Mid Wales League. There is no league directly below the South League however.

The league is sometimes written as the "Mid-Wales League (South)".

In the 2019–20 season, when the season was curtailed due to the coronavirus pandemic, Brecon Corries were champions with a 100% record of 16 wins from 16 games with 143 goals scored and just two conceded. In addition to these statistics the team scored a 27–0 win at Knighton Town Reserves which was expunged from the record books following Knighton’s withdrawal from the league.

Member clubs for 2022–23 season

Felindre
Hay St Marys reserves
Newcastle
Presteigne St. Andrews reserves
St. Harmon

Champions

1960s

1962–63: Felindre
1963–64: Felindre
1964–65: Felindre & Llandrindod Amateurs (shared)
1965–66: Llanidloes Town reserves
1966–67: Crossgates
1967–68: Builth Wells
1968–69: Builth Wells
1969–70: Penybont United

1970s

1970–71: Builth Wells
1971–72: Llanidloes Town reserves
1972–73: Crossgates
1973–74: Presteigne St. Andrews
1974–75: Presteigne St. Andrews
1975–76: Builth Wells
1976–77: Aberystwyth Town reserves
1977–78: Builth Wells
1978–79: Builth Wells
1979–80: Aberystwyth Town reserves

1980s

1980–81: Aberystwyth Town reserves
1981–82: Newtown reserves
1982–83: Builth Wells
1983–84: Newtown reserves
1984–85: Builth Wells
1985–86: Builth Wells
1986–87: Vale of Arrow (Gladestry)
1987–88: Talgarth
1988–89: Kington Town (Herefordshire)
1989–90: Crickhowell

1990s

1990–91: Vale of Arrow (Gladestry)
1991–92: Vale of Arrow (Gladestry)
1992–93: Penybont United
1993–94: Sennybridge
1994–95: Penybont United
1995–96: Vale of Arrow (Gladestry)
1996–97: Newcastle on Clun
1997–98: Newcastle on Clun
1998–99: Sennybridge
1999–2000: Sennybridge

2000s

2000–01: Season abandoned due to Foot & Mouth outbreak – Sennybridge
2001–02: St Harmon
2002–03: Knighton Town
2003–04: Knighton Town
2004–05: Newbridge-on-Wye
2005–06: Rhosgoch
2006–07: Hay St Marys
2007–08: Rhayader Town
2008–09: Hay St Marys
2009–10: Builth Wells

2010s

2010–11: Rhayader Town reserves
2011–12: Newcastle on Clun
2012–13: Rhayader Town reserves
2013–14: Rhayader Town reserves
2014–15: Radnor Valley
2015–16: Rhayader Town reserves
2016–17: Hay St Marys reserves
2017–18: Rhayader Town reserves
2018–19: Talgarth Town
2019–20: Brecon Corries

2020s

2020–21: No competition
2021–22: Builth Wells reserves

Number of titles by winning clubs

 Builth Wells/ reserves – 11 titles
 Rhayader Town/ reserves – 6 titles
 Vale of Arrow (Gladestry) – 4 titles
 Aberystwyth Town reserves – 3 titles
 Felindre – 3 titles
 Hay St Marys/ reserves – 3 titles
 Newcastle on Clun – 3 titles
 Penybont United – 3 titles
 Sennybridge – 3 titles
 Crossgates – 2 titles
 Knighton Town – 2 titles
 Llanidloes Town – 2 titles
 Newtown reserves – 2 titles
 Presteigne St. Andrew's – 2 titles
 Talgarth/ Talgarth Town – 2 titles
 Brecon Corries  – 1 title
 Crickhowell – 1 title
 Kington Town – 1 title
 NNewbridge-on-Wye – 1 title
 Radnor Valley – 1 title
 Rhosgoch – 1 title
 St Harmon – 1 title

See also
Football in Wales
List of football clubs in Wales

References

5
Wales